La Libertad Airport  is an airport serving the town of La Libertad in Petén Department, Guatemala.

See also
 
 
 Transport in Guatemala
 List of airports in Guatemala

References

External links
 OurAirports - La Libertad
 SkyVector - La Libertad Airport
 FallingRain - La Libertad Airport
 OpenStreetMap - La Libertad
 

Airports in Guatemala
Petén Department